Untamed Fury (also known as The Outlander) is a 1947 American film.

Production
The film was financed by the Danches brothers, industrialists who had made a fortune during World War II and wanted to enter into filmmaking. The film's budget was $165,000.

References

External links

1947 films
American black-and-white films
American action films
1940s action films
1940s American films